NGC 2537, also known as the Bear Paw Galaxy or Bear Claw Galaxy, is a blue compact dwarf galaxy in the constellation Lynx, located around 3 degrees NNW of 31 Lyncis. This is Arp 6 or Mrk 86.  It belongs to the iE class of Blue Compact Dwarf (BCD) classification, which is described as galactic spectra with an underlying smooth elliptical Low Surface Brightness component with a superimposed "knotted" star formation component (Gil de Paz et al., 2000, Page 378 Astron. Astrophys. Suppl. Ser. 145).

It was long thought to be possibly interacting with IC 2233. However, this is now considered highly unlikely as radio observations with the Very Large Array showed the two galaxies lie at different distances.

References

External links

 wikisky.org
seds.org

Barred spiral galaxies
Lynx (constellation)
2537
04274
23040
006